Pleasant View is a city in Cheatham County, Tennessee, United States. The population was 4,807 at the 2020 census.

Geography

Demographics

2020 census

As of the 2020 United States census, there were 4,807 people, 1,587 households, and 1,269 families residing in the city.

2010 census
As of the census of 2010, there were 4,149 people, 1,005 households, and 843 families residing in the city. The population density was 233.6 people per square mile (90.2/km2). There were 1,537 housing units at an average density of 83.1 per square mile (32.1/km2). The racial makeup of the city was 97.85% White, 0.41% African American, 0.20% Native American, 0.10% Asian, 0.20% from other races, and 1.23% from two or more races. Hispanic or Latino of any race were 0.78% of the population.

There were 1,005 households, out of which 48.9% had children under the age of 18 living with them, 71.3% were married couples living together, 9.5% had a female householder with no husband present, and 16.1% were non-families. 13.7% of all households were made up of individuals, and 4.6% had someone living alone who was 65 years of age or older. The average household size was 2.91 and the average family size was 3.19.

In the city, the population was spread out, with 31.6% under the age of 18, 6.2% from 18 to 24, 36.4% from 25 to 44, 19.1% from 45 to 64, and 6.8% who were 65 years of age or older. The median age was 33 years. For every 100 females, there were 101.2 males. For every 100 females age 18 and over, there were 97.3 males.

The median income for a household in the city was $54,236, and the median income for a family was $60,543. Males had a median income of $40,490 versus $27,672 for females. The per capita income for the city was $19,236. About 2.8% of families and 4.9% of the population were below the poverty line, including 3.0% of those under age 18 and 13.4% of those age 65 or over.

Education 
Schools in Pleasant View include Pleasant View Christian School, Pleasant View Elementary School, Sycamore Middle School and Sycamore High School.

Government
Pleasant View uses a city council consisting of five members including the mayor. The current mayor is Bill Anderson.

References

Cities in Tennessee
Cities in Cheatham County, Tennessee